Anthony Keck was an architect.

Anthony Keck may also refer to:

 Sir Anthony Keck (MP) (1630–1695), British lawyer and politician, MP for Tiverton 1691–95
 Anthony James Keck (1740–1782), English politician, MP for Leicester 1755–56, for Newton 1768–74
 Anthony Keck (1708–1767), MP for Woodstock 1753-67

See also